The men's 4 × 10 kilometre relay cross-country skiing event was part of the cross-country skiing programme at the 1960 Winter Olympics, in Squaw Valley, California, United States. It was the fifth appearance of the event. The competition was held on Saturday, February 27, 1960, at the McKinney Creek Stadium.

Finland won the gold medal with less than one second ahead of Nordic rivals Norway. It was the third time out of five that Finland had won gold in this event. Defending champions Soviet Union took the bronze medal. It was also Veikko Hakulinen's third Olympic gold and first at these games.

Results

References

External links
1960 Squaw Valley Official Olympic Report
Sport Statistics - International Competitions Archive

Men's 4 x 10 kilometre relay
Men's 4 × 10 kilometre relay cross-country skiing at the Winter Olympics